Hamlet is a 2011 Canadian drama film written and directed by Bruce Ramsay in his directorial debut.  It is a condensed retelling of William Shakespeare's play Hamlet set in 1940s England.  Ramsay stars alongside Lara Gilchrist,  Peter Wingfield, Gillian Barber, and  Duncan Fraser.  It premiered at the Vancouver International Film Festival and was theatrically released in 2014.

Plot 
In 1940s London, Hamlet attempts to resolve the murder of his father.

Cast 
 Bruce Ramsay as Prince Hamlet
 Lara Gilchrist as Ophelia
 Peter Wingfield as King Claudius
 Gillian Barber Gertude
 Duncan Fraser as Polonius
 Haig Sutherland as Laertes
 Stephen Lobo as Horatio
 Russel Roberts as King Hamlet

Release 
Hamlet premiered on October 11, 2011, at the Vancouver International Film Festival.  It received a limited release in January 2014.

Reception 
Rotten Tomatoes, a review aggregator, reports that 0% of five surveyed critics gave the film a positive review; the average rating is 2/10.  Joe Leydon of Variety wrote that the film "seldom rises above the level of a good try" but may intrigue fans and scholars with the decisions made in compressing the narrative to 90 minutes.  Nicolas Rapold of The New York Times wrote, "While Mr. Ramsay accomplishes some kind of a trick in streamlining the play, his trimming of corners feels more like a taking away of the center."  Annlee Ellingson of the Los Angeles Times negatively compared its creativity to Much Ado About Nothing and called it "a focused, if at times melodramatic, take on the play's beating heart".

References

External links 
 

2011 films
2011 drama films
Canadian drama films
Canadian independent films
English-language Canadian films
2010s English-language films
Films based on Hamlet
Films set in the 1940s
Films set in London
2011 independent films
Canadian films based on plays
2010s Canadian films